Supertram may refer to:

 a superlative name for a tram
 Sheffield Supertram, a modern tram system in Sheffield, England
 Park Square Bridge aka Supertram Bridge, in Sheffield, England
 Siemens-Duewag Supertram, a tram vehicle manufactured by Siemens-Duewag and used on Sheffield Supertram
 Leeds Supertram, a proposed but rejected modern tram system project for the city of Leeds, England
 Bristol Supertram, a proposed but rejected tram system project for Bristol, England

See also 
 Supertramp and Supertramp (disambiguation)